The 1999 Nigerian Senate election in Plateau State was held on February 20, 1999, to elect members of the Nigerian Senate to represent Plateau State. Silas Janfa representing Plateau South, Ibrahim Mantu representing Plateau Central, and Davou Zang representing Plateau North all won on the platform of Peoples Democratic Party

Overview

Summary

Results

Plateau South 
The election was won by Silas Janfa of the Peoples Democratic Party.

Plateau Central 
The election was won by Ibrahim Mantu of the Peoples Democratic Party.

Plateau North 
The election was won by Davou Zang of the People's Democratic Party (Nigeria).

References 

Pla
Pla
Plateau State Senate elections